Jack Stewart is a former diving representative from New Zealand.

At the 1950 British Empire Games he won the bronze medal in the men's 1 m springboard event. Four years later at the 1954 British Empire and Commonwealth Games he won another bronze medal again in the men's 1 m springboard.

References

New Zealand male divers
Commonwealth Games bronze medallists for New Zealand
Divers at the 1950 British Empire Games
Divers at the 1954 British Empire and Commonwealth Games
Living people
Commonwealth Games medallists in diving
Year of birth missing (living people)
Medallists at the 1950 British Empire Games
Medallists at the 1954 British Empire and Commonwealth Games